Jan Pogány (real name Jan Maślankiewicz-Pogány, born 23 June 1960 in Kołobrzeg, Poland) is a Polish classical composer, conductor  and cellist.
His music adopts the romantic style and is a symbiosis of the modern form of romantic harmony and lyrical melodic line.

Biography

He is a graduate of cello and conducting studies in Richard Strauss Conservatory in Munich (Germany). He studied at the Music Academy in Wroclaw (Poland). He works with numerous orchestras such as the ones Germany, Japan, Korea, Germany, Greece, Poland as well as opera companies.

He founded the Polish Chamber Orchestra Camerata-Wrocław. He was Director General of the International Brahms Festival Wroclaw.

Recognition
2008 – the II prize at the International Composers Competitions in Torrevie (Spain),
2009 – the III prize at the International Composers Competitions in Luxembourg.

Works 
 2002 – Film music for the German TV crime series Mit Herz und Handschellen
 2005 – Cantata of Kołobrzeg for two sopranos, tenor, baritone, choir and orchestra, the composition was written on the jubilee 750th anniversary of Kolobrzeg
 2006 – Fantasia in D minor for cello and orchestra
 2007 – Cantata “La Voce del Destino”  for tenor, violin and orchestra
 2008 – Opera  "Acrobat" composer is also the author of the libretto, first performance was at the Munich Philharmonic Hall.
 2008 – Introduction and Waltz of fate.
 2009 – Requiem a-moll for opera singer Antonina Kawecka.
 2009 – Musical “Cruise”
 2011 – Requiem Smolensk in memoriam. First performance was in the Polish Radio Concert Hall in Wroclaw in the first anniversary of plane crash in Smolensk.     
...my Requiem gives hope and not force to cry. The open space of human life is closing from the absolute key of the time but it is only a prelude to eternity -Jan Pogány 
 2011 – “Rhapsody of Japan” for tenor, choir and orchestra.
 2014 - Oman's Serenade for violin and orchestra.

References

External links

Artist's website 
Interview for a newspaper MuscatDaily in Oman
Interview with Jan Pogány page IV (Polish newspaper)
Article about the premiere of Requiem (Polish newspaper)
 Premiere of  Requiem Smolensk in memoriam (music)
 Score
Requiem

1960 births
Light music composers
Living people
Male film score composers
Male musical theatre composers
Polish classical composers
Polish male classical composers
Polish classical musicians
Polish conductors (music)
Male conductors (music)
Polish film score composers
21st-century conductors (music)
21st-century male musicians